A central consonant, also known as a median consonant, is a consonant sound that is produced when air flows across the center of the mouth over the tongue. The class contrasts with lateral consonants, in which air flows over the sides of the tongue rather than down its center.

Examples of central consonants are the voiced alveolar fricative (the "z" in the English word "zoo") and the palatal approximant (the "y" in the English word "yes"). Others are the central fricatives , the central approximants , the trills , and the central flaps . 

The term is most relevant for approximants and fricatives (for which there are contrasting lateral and central consonants - e.g.  versus  and  versus ). Stops that have "lateral release" can be written in the International Phonetic Alphabet using a superscript symbol, e.g. , or can be implied by a following lateral consonant, e.g. . The labial fricatives  often—perhaps usually—have lateral airflow, as occlusion between the teeth and lips blocks the airflow in the center, but nonetheless they are not considered lateral consonants because no language makes a distinction between the two.

In some languages, the centrality of a phoneme may be indeterminate.

See also
Manner of articulation
List of phonetics topics

References

 
Consonants by manner of articulation